Corbucci is an Italian-language surname. Notable people with the surname include:

 Bruno Corbucci (1931–1996), Italian screenwriter and film director
 Sergio Corbucci (1926–1990), Italian film director
 Leonardo Corbucci, Italian-American film director

Italian-language surnames